Anne Ryg (born 14 December 1967) is a Norwegian actress known from her role as Karen Borg in the movies about the detective Hanne Wilhelmsen; Blind gudinne and Salige er de som tørster. Ryg was formerly married to comedian Harald Eia, but the two separated in 2007. Eia and Ryg had been married for twelve years, and the couple had two daughters.

Select filmography

References

External links 

1967 births
Living people
Norwegian film actresses
Norwegian television actresses